The House in the Dark is a 1945 novel by the Norwegian writer Tarjei Vesaas. It tells the story of a frightening, darkened house, to which men are trying to dig tunnels, but are routinely captured and taken away in a truck. The novel was written during the last winter of World War II and is an allegory for the German occupation of Norway. An English translation by Elizabeth Rokkan was published in 1976.

The book was awarded the Melsom Prize.

References

Further reading

External links
 Publicity page 

1945 Norwegian novels
20th-century Norwegian novels
Norwegian-language novels
Novels by Tarjei Vesaas